In mathematics, particularly in set theory, the aleph numbers are a sequence of numbers used to represent the cardinality (or size) of infinite sets that can be well-ordered. They were introduced by the mathematician Georg Cantor and are named after the symbol he used to denote them, the Semitic letter aleph.

Continuing in this manner, it is possible to define a cardinal number  for every ordinal number  as described below.

The concept and notation are due to Georg Cantor,
who defined the notion of cardinality and realized that infinite sets can have different cardinalities.

The aleph numbers differ from the infinity commonly found in algebra and calculus, in that the alephs measure the sizes of sets, while infinity is commonly defined either as an extreme limit of the real number line (applied to a function or sequence that "diverges to infinity" or "increases without bound"), or as an extreme point of the extended real number line.

Aleph-nought
 (aleph-nought, also aleph-zero or aleph-null) is the cardinality of the set of all natural numbers, and is an infinite cardinal. A set has cardinality  if and only if it is countably infinite, that is, there is a bijection (one-to-one correspondence) between it and the natural numbers. Examples of such sets are

 the set of all integers, 
 any infinite subset of the integers, such as the set of all square numbers or the set of all prime numbers,
 the set of all rational numbers, 
 the set of all constructible numbers (in the geometric sense),
 the set of all algebraic numbers, 
 the set of all computable numbers, 
 the set of all binary strings of finite length, and 
 the set of all finite subsets of any given countably infinite set.

For example, the sequence (with ordinality ) of all positive odd integers followed by all positive even integers

is an ordering of the set (with cardinality ) of positive integers.

If the axiom of countable choice (a weaker version of the axiom of choice) holds, then  is smaller than any other infinite cardinal.

Aleph-one

 is the cardinality of the set of all countable ordinal numbers, called  or sometimes . This  is itself an ordinal number larger than all countable ones, so it is an uncountable set. If the axiom of choice is used, it can be further proved that the class of cardinal numbers is totally ordered, and thus  is the second-smallest infinite cardinal number. (This follows from the fact that the union of a countable number of countable sets is itself countable – one of the most common applications of the axiom of choice.) This fact is analogous to the situation in  : every finite set of natural numbers has a maximum which is also a natural number, and finite unions of finite sets are finite.

is actually a useful concept, if somewhat exotic-sounding. An example application is "closing" with respect to countable operations; e.g., trying to explicitly describe the σ-algebra generated by an arbitrary collection of subsets (see e.g. Borel hierarchy). This is harder than most explicit descriptions of "generation" in algebra (vector spaces, groups, etc.) because in those cases we only have to close with respect to finite operations – sums, products, and the like.

Continuum hypothesis

The cardinality of the set of real numbers (cardinality of the continuum) is  It cannot be determined from ZFC (Zermelo–Fraenkel set theory augmented with the axiom of choice) where this number fits exactly in the aleph number hierarchy, but it follows from ZFC that the continuum hypothesis, CH, is equivalent to the identity

The CH states that there is no set whose cardinality is strictly between that of the integers and the real numbers. CH is independent of ZFC: it can be neither proven nor disproven within the context of that axiom system (provided that ZFC is consistent). That CH is consistent with ZFC was demonstrated by Kurt Gödel in 1940, when he showed that its negation is not a theorem of ZFC. That it is independent of ZFC was demonstrated by Paul Cohen in 1963, when he showed conversely that the CH itself is not a theorem of ZFC – by the (then-novel) method of forcing.

Aleph-omega
Aleph-omega is

where the smallest infinite ordinal is denoted . That is, the cardinal number  is the least upper bound of
 

 is the first uncountable cardinal number that can be demonstrated within Zermelo–Fraenkel set theory not to be equal to the cardinality of the set of all real numbers; for any positive integer n we can consistently assume that  and moreover it is possible to assume  is as large as we like.

Aleph-α for general α
To define  for arbitrary ordinal number  we must define the successor cardinal operation, which assigns to any cardinal number  the next larger well-ordered cardinal  (if the axiom of choice holds, this is the next larger cardinal).

We can then define the aleph numbers as follows:

 
 

 

The α-th infinite initial ordinal is written .  Its cardinality is written  

Informally, the aleph function  is a bijection from the ordinals to the infinite cardinals.
Formally, in ZFC,  is not a function, since it is not a set (due to the Burali-Forti paradox).

Fixed points of omega
For any ordinal α we have
 

For example, for any successor ordinal α this holds. There are, however, some limit ordinals which are fixed points of the omega function, because of the fixed-point lemma for normal functions. The first such is the limit of the sequence

 

Any weakly inaccessible cardinal is also a fixed point of the aleph function. This can be shown in ZFC as follows. Suppose  is a weakly inaccessible cardinal. If  were a successor ordinal, then  would be a successor cardinal and hence not weakly inaccessible. Thus  and consequently  which makes it a fixed point.

Role of axiom of choice

The cardinality of any infinite ordinal number is an aleph number. Every aleph is the cardinality of some ordinal. The least of these is its initial ordinal. Any set whose cardinality is an aleph is equinumerous with an ordinal and is thus well-orderable.

Each finite set is well-orderable, but does not have an aleph as its cardinality.

The assumption that the cardinality of each infinite set is an aleph number is equivalent over ZF to the existence of a well-ordering of every set, which in turn is equivalent to the axiom of choice. ZFC set theory, which includes the axiom of choice, implies that every infinite set has an aleph number as its cardinality (i.e. is equinumerous with its initial ordinal), and thus the initial ordinals of the aleph numbers serve as a class of representatives for all possible infinite cardinal numbers.

When cardinality is studied in ZF without the axiom of choice, it is no longer possible to prove that each infinite set has some aleph number as its cardinality; the sets whose cardinality is an aleph number are exactly the infinite sets that can be well-ordered. The method of Scott's trick is sometimes used as an alternative way to construct representatives for cardinal numbers in the setting of ZF. This has the property that  if and only if  and  have the same cardinality.

See also
 Beth number
 Gimel function
 Regular cardinal
 Transfinite number
 Ordinal number

Notes

Citations

External links

 
 

Cardinal numbers
Hebrew alphabet
Infinity